The Americano is a 1916 American silent adventure / romantic comedy film directed by John Emerson and stars Douglas Fairbanks in his last production for Triangle Film Corporation. Based on the novel Blaze Derringer, by Eugene P. Lyle, Jr., the scenario was written by John Emerson and Anita Loos who also wrote the film's intertitles. The film was re-released by S.A. Lynch Enterprises on August 21, 1923. Three 16mm prints and one 8mm print of the film still exists. Set in a fictional South American country of Paragonia, it has been described as one of a group of films that supported United States imperialism by providing support to the idea of manifest destiny.

Cast
Douglas Fairbanks as Blaze Derringer
Alma Rubens as Juana de Castille
Spottiswoode Aitken as Presidente de Castille
Carl Stockdale as Salsa Espada
Tote Du Crow as Alberto de Castille
Charles Stevens as Colonel Gargaras
Mildred Harris as Stenographer
Lillian Langdon as Senora de Castille
Thomas Jefferson
Tom Wilson as Hartod Armitage White aka Whitey
Marguerite Marsh
Alan Hale Sr.

Contract with Triangle Film
Although Fairbanks was receiving $15,000 per week during production of The Americano, making him the third highest-paid actor after Mary Pickford and Charlie Chaplin, he considered himself underpaid given his films made millions for the studio. He was able to end his contract with Triangle following The Americano by noting that one of its clauses required that Fairbanks' films be supervised by director D. W. Griffith, which Triangle had not done for several of his last films.

References

External links

Films directed by John Emerson
1916 films
1910s adventure comedy films
1910s romantic comedy films
American adventure comedy films
American romantic comedy films
American silent feature films
American black-and-white films
Films based on American novels
Films set in South America
Films with screenplays by Anita Loos
Triangle Film Corporation films
1916 comedy films
1910s American films
Silent romantic comedy films
Silent adventure comedy films
Silent American comedy films
1910s English-language films